Helenoscoparia transversalis is a moth in the family Crambidae. It was described by Edith Wollaston in 1879. It is found on Saint Helena.

The larvae have been recorded feeding on lichens.

References

Moths described in 1879
Scopariinae